The State Line Slough is a stream in Atchison County, Missouri. 
The primary coordinates for State Line Slough places it within the Missouri 64482 ZIP Code area.

The stream of State Line Slough runs through Benton Township, Atchison County, Missouri.

See also
State Line Slough (Iowa)
List of rivers of Missouri

References

Rivers of Atchison County, Missouri